George Whelan may refer to:

 George J. Whelan, mayor of San Francisco, 1856
 George Whelan (boxer) (born 1934), English boxer
 George Whelan (sport shooter) (1859–1938), South African sports shooter
 George J. Whelan, co-founder of United Cigar Stores